Prynce Hopkins (March 5, 1885 - August 1970), who was born Prince Charles Hopkins, was an American Socialist, pacifist and author of numerous psychology books and periodicals. He was jailed and fined for his strident anti-war views, pro-union activities, and investigated for his associations with such social reformers as Upton Sinclair and Emma Goldman.

Background

Prynce Hopkins, christened Prince Charles Hopkins, spelled his name Pryns from about 1921 to 1948, and thereafter Prynce. He was a wealthy Californian described by the several newspapers as a "socialist millionaire." He had inherited a good deal of stock in the Singer Sewing Machine company, which his father, Charles Harris Hopkins, obtained from his second wife, Ruth Merrit Singer, after she died in childbirth. (Prynce was the only child of Charles' third wife, Mary Isabel Booth.) In 1913, Charles Hopkins died and left Prynce $3 million. Mary received $3 million.  Prynce used his money to fund leftist causes, which he labeled the "uplift movement," and self-publish books on psychoanalysis, social reform and religion.

Hopkins obtained his BA from Yale, a Master's degree in education from Columbia University, and a PhD from London University in psychology. He owned and ran a school in Santa Barbara, California, called "Boyland. Following WW I, Prynce moved to England and France, where he owned and ran a school for boys (the Chateau de Burres) based on Montessori-like methods, from 1921 to England's entrance in WWII in 1939. During the 1940s, while living in Pasadena, California, and no longer a Pacifist, Hopkins published a socialist journal titled Freedom. He also lectured on comparative religion at Pomona College.

Hopkins was known for his unorthodox approach to social reform. His interests in mixing psychology, social reform and theology resulted in several books, including Father or Sons? (1927), The Psychology of Social Movements; a Psycho-Analytic View of Society (1938) and From Gods to Dictators: Psychology of Religions and their Totalitarian Substitutes (1944).

Hopkins was born March 5, 1885 in Oakland, California. In 1898, his parents completed a house in Santa Barbara, California, and moved there from San Francisco. In 1912, Hopkins opened a progressive boys' boarding school called Boyland in the hills above Santa Barbara. (The land and buildings of "Boyland" became a hotel named, "The Samarkand"--and is now a retirement community of the same name.) The school, however, was short-lived. When the United States entered World War I in 1917, Hopkins became a vocal anti-war protester. He worked with anarchists Emma Goldman and Alexander Berkman for the anti-war organization League for Amnesty of Political Prisoners. When Goldman was imprisoned for her anti-war activities, Hopkins became chairman of the League.

Prynce opened and operated a second progressive school for boys outside Paris, France, (*the Chateau du Bures) in about 1925, which closed upon the occupation of France by the Germans.

Arrests
During the same period, he was indicted by a federal Grand Jury on charges of violating the Espionage Act and arrested. His arrest was based less on spying and more for impeding Army recruiting. The U.S. Department of Justice raided Boyland and seized anti-war literature and other material as evidence. Materials seized were two published books "More Prussian Than Prussia" and the "Ethics of Murder," which were vehemently anti-war and sympathetic to Germany. On August 31, 1918, Hopkins and his co-defendants Pastor George H. Greenfield, the Rev. Floyd Hardin and Carl Broner pleaded guilty to four counts of violating the Espionage Act. Federal District Court Judge Benjamin F. Bledsoe fined Hopkins $25,000; Greenfield $5,000; Hardin, $5,000; and Broner $500. The defendants promised the court not to publicly discuss the war or distribute anti-war literature. The U.S. Justice Department continued to investigate Hopkins and read his mail throughout 1918 and most of 1919, but no further action was taken.

Hopkins closed Boyland and founded a similar institution in France. On January 12, 1921, while still in exile in Europe, Hopkins married Eileen Maud Thomas of Wolverhampton, Staffordshire, England, at St. Peter’s Church in London [destroyed during WWII] before embarking on a six-month honeymoon around the world.

By 1922, he and Eileen returned to the United States. For a year they lived outside New York City where Hopkins founded Labor Age magazine, which was associated with the Socialist League for Industrial Democracy. He and his wife then moved to Pasadena, California, where he befriended Upton Sinclair and became associated with the Industrial Workers of the World labor organization. At the same time he renewed his friendship with fellow Socialist Rob Wagner, later editor and publisher of Script, a literary film magazine. Wagner had sent his two sons to Boyland. Wagner introduced Hopkins to other leftists such as writers William B. DeMille and Max Eastman, as well as illustrator Leo Politi, who contributed to Script and "Freedom".

Attending a rally for 600 striking dockworkers in San Pedro, California, in 1923, Hopkins was arrested on what is today known as Liberty Hill with Sinclair, Sinclair's brother-in-law Hunter Kimbrough, and Hugh Hardyman, who attempted to recite the First Amendment of the Constitution, or Free Speech Amendment.

By 1924, Prynce and Eileen returned to live in England. They adopted a son, Peter, and in 1925, Eileen gave birth to Eileen Mary (known as "Betty May"). In 1929, Eileen divorced Prynce and married a "former suitor", Vernon Armitage. Peter and Betty May became the wards of Armitage after Eileen's death in 1933. (ref. Hopkins, Prynce. "Both Hands Before the Fire").  

Prynce married Florence Gertrude "Fay" Cartledge (b.1910) in 1933. They took a "round the world" honeymoon and returned to live in London where Prynce resumed teaching at University College. In 1936, he edited the magazine, "Science and Society". Their daughter Jennifer was born in 1938. After the outbreak of World War II, Prynce, Fay, Fay's mother Dorette, Jennifer and Eileen sailed for New York in October, 1940. The family lived first in Berkeley and then Pasadena--where Prynce started "Freedom" magazine and taught at Claremont College. In  1943, Fay give birth to their son, David. In 1945, Prynce ran (unsuccessfully) for the Democratic office of state Representative. Fay and Prynce were divorced in 1947. Prynce left Pasadena to live with his aging mother in Santa Barbara; and Fay married Stephen Enke in 1949. (ref. Hopkins, Prynce. "Both Hands Before the Fire") 

In the last ten years of his life, Prynce continued writing and traveled to Morocco, Burma, Iran, India, Jerusalem and Egypt. He hosted his children and grandchildren, international friends, and meetings of the World Federalists and Ethical Culture Society in the modern home he built in Santa Barbara after his mother's death in 1955. He gave lectures at the Adult Education Center (ref. Hopkins, Prynce. "Both Hands Before the Fire") and set up Trust Funds for charitable donations to various causes he had always supported--such as Planned Parenthood and Abortion Law Reform. Prynce Hopkins died in Santa Barbara in 1970 after returning from a solo trip to the World Fair in Japan. He was 85. (ref. Jennifer Hopkins)

Freedom magazine

At the outbreak of World War II, Hopkins, who by then was 57 years old, returned to his anti-war activities and founded Freedom magazine in Pasadena, Calif. Freedom, published quarterly, was a vocal political publication that offered an assortment of medical, social, psychological and pacifist reports to its small, but supportive, circle of readers.

Freedom's contributors included an eclectic group of writers. Mahatma Gandhi wrote an article on the role of women. Dr. Daniel H. Kress, one of the first physicians to recognize the health dangers of tobacco. Harold F. Bing, who was imprisoned during World War I as a conscientious objector and was active in War Resisters' International, wrote regularly for the magazine. Among other contributors were Dr. Abraham H. Maslow, considered the father of Humanism in psychology; Ada Farris, a writer for Script and the Saturday Evening Post; and Gilean Douglas, who wrote for New Mexico Quarterly. Los Angeles artist Leo Politi served as art director and contributed regular illustrations.

Anti-smoking activism

Hopkins authored the book Gone Up in Smoke: An Analysis of Tobaccoism, in 1948. He was an early observer to warn the public of medical and social problems associated with tobacco. He documented the shortened life and diseases caused by smoking.

John Harvey Kellogg first used the term "Tobaccoism" in 1923. At age 21, Hopkins had visited the Battle Creek Sanitarium for his father's treatment in 1906 when Kellogg was the medical superintendent.

Published work

Father or Sons? (K.Paul, Trench, Trubner, 1927)
The Psychology of Social Movements; a Psycho-Analytic View of Society (London, G. Allen & Unwin, 1938)
Aids to Successful Study (London, G. Allen & Unwin, 1941)
From Gods to Dictators: Psychology of Religions and their Totalitarian Substitutes (Girard, Kan., Haldeman-Julius Publications, 1944)
Gone Up in Smoke: An Analysis of Tobaccoism (The Highland Press, Culver City, Calif. 1948)
A Westerner Looks East (Los Angeles, W. F. Lewis, 1951)
Both Hands Before The Fire (Penobscot, Me., Traversity Press, 1962)
The Social Psychology of Religious Experience (New York, Paine-Whitman, 1962)
World Invisible (Penobscot, Me., Traversity Press, 1963)
Orientation, Socialization and Individuation (Asia Publishing House, 1963)

References

 Hollywood Bohemia: The Roots of Progressive Politics in Rob Wagner's Script by Rob Leicester Wagner (2016)

1885 births
1970 deaths
Activists from California
American pacifists
American social activists
American socialists
Analysands of Ernest Jones
Anti-smoking activists
Teachers College, Columbia University alumni
University of Wisconsin–Madison alumni
Workers' rights activists
Writers from Santa Barbara, California
Yale University alumni